Pietrelcina is a town and comune in the province of Benevento in the Campania region of southern Italy. It is the birthplace of Saint Pio of Pietrelcina, better known as Padre Pio.

Geography
Benevento, Paduli, Pago Veiano and Pesco Sannita are neighbouring towns.

International relations

Pietrelcina is twinned with:
 San Giovanni Rotondo, Italy
 Bethlehem, Palestine
 Wadowice, Poland, since 2006

References

External links 
 Photo Gallery 

Cities and towns in Campania